Carl H. Lindner College of Business, also referred to as "Lindner" and "Lindner College," is a college of the University of Cincinnati. The college is located in Carl H. Lindner Hall. On June 21, 2011, the college was named after Carl Henry Lindner, Jr. in honor of the contributions he has made to the university, college, and the business community. The college has three undergraduate degree options, five master's degrees, and a doctoral program spread out over seven departments.

Lindner is ranked as a top undergraduate business school and top 75 graduate business schools in the nation by U.S. News & World Report and has three honors programs, the Carl H. Lindner Honors-PLUS program, the Kolodzik Business Scholars program, and the Circle of Excellence program.

History
Lindner College traces its roots to 1906 when the Cincinnati College of Finance, Commerce and Accounts was established. In 1912, the University of Cincinnati Board of Trustees took over the college. In 1919, the College of Commerce was merged with the College of Engineering to form the College of Engineering Commerce. In 1946, the college resumed operation as a separate entity. Over the years several programs were added, such as a Master of Business Administration (MBA) program, a PhD program in 1966, and a Master of Science (MS) program in 1978.

In April 2017, construction went underway to create a new, modern building for Lindner College. The building is four stories tall (plus a basement) and totals around 225,000 square feet. The building also has two courtyards, which total 6,230 square feet. Some specialty features of the new building include the Kautz Attic, a space designated and designed to promote entrepreneurship for students, as well as the Johnson Investment Counsel Investment Lab, featuring a simulated trading floor and 12 Bloomberg computer terminals to be utilized by students. There is also an area for Career Services, featuring twelve interview rooms and a corporate recruitment area, helping Lindner students obtain employment. The building opened for classes in the fall of 2019, with a grand opening celebration held September 19, 2019.

Academic programs
Lindner also collaborates on Master of Health Administration housed in the College of Allied Health Sciences and in conjunction with the College of Medicine.

Accounting
Undergraduate: BBA Accounting
Graduate: MS Accounting
PhD: Concentration in Accounting

Economics
Undergraduate: BA Economics, BBA Business Economics
Graduate: MS Applied Economics
PhD: Concentration in Economics

Finance - Real Estate
Undergraduate: BBA Finance, BBA Real Estate
Graduate: MBA Finance, MBA Commercial Real Estate, MS Finance 
PhD: Concentration in Finance

Management
Undergraduate: BBA Entrepreneurship, BBA International Business
Graduate: MBA Management
PhD: Concentration in Management

Marketing
Undergraduate: BBA Marketing
Graduate: MS Marketing, MBA Marketing, Graduate Certificate in Marketing
PhD: Concentration in Marketing

Operations, Business Analytics, and Information Systems
Undergraduate: BBA Operations Management, BBA Information Systems, BS Industrial Management (a degree offered in conjunction with the College of Engineering and Applied Science)
Graduate: MS in Business Analytics (previously known as MS Quantitative Analysis), MBA Quantitative Analysis, MBA Operations Management, Certificate in Operations Excellence, PhD in business with Concentration in Operations Management and Quantitative Analysis.
PhD: Doctor of Philosophy in Business, Concentration in Quantitative Analysis, Concentration Operations Management, and Concentration in Information Systems.

Insurance and Risk Management 
Undergraduate: BBA Insurance and Risk Management

International Business 
Undergraduate: BBA International Business

Centers
Center for Business Analytics
Center for Entrepreneurship Education & Research
Small Business Institute®
Center for Performance Excellence
Center for Productivity Improvement
Economics Center for Education & Research
Goering Center for Family & Private Business
Offers Certificate in Family Business
The Business Boards Institute
Real Estate Center
Center for Professional Selling

Student organizations
Accounting Club
Alpha Kappa Psi Professional Business Fraternity
Alpha Rho Epsilon Real Estate Club
American Marketing Association (UC AMA)
American Production and Inventory Control Society (APICS)
Association of Supply Chain Management
Bearcat Advertising and Networking Group (BANG)
Bearcat Ventures
Beta Alpha Psi Accounting Honorary
Beta Gamma Sigma Honorary
Business Analytics Club
Business Fellows
CATALYST Marketing
Center for Entrepreneurship
Economics Society
Lindner Ambassadors (Volunteer Recruitment Team)
Lindner Business Honors Student Advisory Board
Lindner Graduate Students Association
Lindner Student Association (Student Government Tribunal)
Lindner Women in Business (LWiB)
Delta Sigma Pi Professional Business Fraternity
Finance Club
International Business Club (IBC)
Investment Club
Masters of Business Administration Association (MBAA)
National Association of Black Accountants (NABA)
National Association of Women MBA (NAWMBA)
Neo Initiative
Pi Sigma Epsilon Sales & Marketing Fraternity
Pride at Lindner (PaL)
Sales Leadership Club
Sport Business Consulting
UC Hospitality
UC Real Estate Association
Queen City Consulting

Rankings and recognition
Lindner College houses several ranked programs, including an undergraduate Accounting program that ranks 10th in US and a Real Estate that has been named the 5th most influential in US by the Journal of Real Estate Economics. The Princeton Review and Entrepreneur Magazine have also recognized the entrepreneurship program as one of the top 25 in the nation.	 
U.S. News & World Report 2011:	 	
One of the 386 'best undergraduate business schools' in 2010
Top 10 MBA for Highest Financial Value Upon Graduation
75th out of the top MBA programs	 	
37th out of all public institutions	
Princeton Review 2011:	 
One of the best 301 business schools	 	
BusinessWeek	 	
top 100 undergraduate business programs	 
Bloomberg BusinessWeek 2013	 
36th in the nation among public business schools	 
84th in the nation among all business schools	 
No. 5 accounting	 
No. 6 quantitative methods	 
No. 7 ethics	 
No. 10 microeconomics	 
No. 10 macroeconomics	 
No. 14 international business	 
No. 15 operations management	 
No. 16 finance	 
No. 37 information systems	 
No. 40 sustainability	 
No. 41 entrepreneurship	 
No. 45 corporate strategy	 
No. 55 business law

See also
List of business schools in the United States
List of United States graduate business school rankings

References

External links

 

Business schools in Ohio
University of Cincinnati
Educational institutions established in 1906
1906 establishments in Ohio
Lindner family